Municipal Stadium is a multi-use stadium in Botoşani, Romania. It is currently used mostly for football and rugby union matches, being the home ground of FC Botoşani. The stadium holds 7,782 people.

Events

Association football

Association football

References

External links
StadiumDB profile

FC Botoșani
Football venues in Romania
Botoșani
Buildings and structures in Botoșani County